This article presents the discography of The Jackson 5 (currently known as The Jacksons), an American family band from Gary, Indiana.

Founding group members Jackie, Tito, Jermaine, Marlon and Michael formed the group after performing in an early incarnation called The Jackson Brothers, which originally consisted of a trio of the three older brothers. In 1975, the youngest brother Randy Jackson replaced Jermaine when the brothers signed with Epic Records and Jermaine stayed with Motown Records. In 1983, Jermaine returned to the group, but by 1989 Marlon and Michael had already left to focus on their solo careers.

Overall, 18 of the group's singles rose within the US Billboard Top 20, with four of them reaching #1.

Albums

Studio albums

As The Jackson 5

As The Jacksons

Live albums

Selected compilation albums

Soundtrack albums

Singles

As The Jackson 5

As The Jacksons

As a collaborating artist

Home video

The Jackson 5

The Jacksons

Music videos

Notes

References

External links

Discography
Rhythm and blues discographies
Discographies of American artists
Pop music group discographies
Disco discographies